Lee Thomas may refer to:

Lee Arden Thomas (1886–1953), American architect
Lee Thomas (baseball) (1936–2022), American baseball player and executive
Lee M. Thomas (born 1944), head of the United States Environmental Protection Agency, 1985-1989
Lee Thomas (reporter) (born 1967), American reporter and author of Turning White
Lee Thomas (rugby union) (born 1984), rugby player
Lee Thomas (horror writer), horror writer of Stained and The Dust of Wonderland

See also

Thomas Lee (disambiguation)